Cantilena is the second album recorded by the British jazz quartet, First House. It was released by ECM. The album presents a studio performance of leader and saxophonist Ken Stubbs with Django Bates on piano, Mick Hutton on bass and Martin France on drums, recorded over 2 days in March, 1989 in Norway.

Reception
Jazz commentator Richard Lehnert states "Well my first – and second and third-impressions of First House's cool, sculpted, heady music are of sustained fires of excitement, intelligence, and clarity. Live long and prosper, guys – you've charted another great, serious jazz album."

Master saxophonist, David Liebman comments on how... "his (Stubbs's) playing is remarkably cliche free" and also states, "It is so refreshing to hear young musicians going for a group sound as their major goal.

In Billboard Magazine, Jeff Levenson cites Ken Stubbs and Django Bates as examples of how "Great Britain's young turks have adopted him (John Coltrane) as a spiritual forebear.

High Fidelity Magazine stated that, "The future of British jazz is in good hands with this acoustic quartet. The follow up to the well-received 'Eréndira', 'Cantilena' is a relaxed, free form set with classy performances all round but some particularly fine playing from Ken Stubbs on alto sax."

Track listing
"Cantilena" Ken Stubbs – 3:28
"Underfelt" Django Bates – 4:52
"Dimple" Django Bates – 3:51
"Sweet Williams" Django Bates – 5:05
"Low Down (Toytown)" Ken Stubbs – 3:28
"Hollyhocks" Django Bates – 3:23
"Madeleine After Prayer" Eddie Parker – 1:47
"Shining Brightly" Ken Stubbs – 4:12
"Jay-Tee" Django Bates – 3:55
"Pablo" Ken Stubbs – 3:15

Personnel
Ken Stubbs – alto and soprano saxophones
Django Bates – piano, tenor horn
Mick Hutton – double bass
Martin France – percussion
Manfred Eicher – producer
Jan Erik Konshaug – engineer
Dieter Rehm – design

References

Albums produced by Manfred Eicher
1989 albums
ECM Records albums
Ken Stubbs albums